Yarom Gonbad (also Romanized as Yārom Gonbad) is a village in Sangar Rural District, in the Central District of Faruj County, North Khorasan Province, Iran. At the 2006 census, its population was 87, in 20 families.

References 

Populated places in Faruj County